The Old Huntington Jail is a historic jail at 223 East Broadway in Huntington, Arkansas.  It is a single-story stone structure, fashioned out of  courses of cut stone.  It was built in 1888 by the Kansas and Texas Coal Company, a mining concern that platted and founded Huntington in 1887.  The interior has a central access space with two small cells on the right, and one large one on the left.  The jail was in active use into the mid-1950s, and is now part of a local history museum.

The building was listed on the National Register of Historic Places in 2008.

See also
National Register of Historic Places listings in Sebastian County, Arkansas

References

External links
Museum web site

Jails on the National Register of Historic Places in Arkansas
Infrastructure completed in 1888
Museums in Sebastian County, Arkansas
National Register of Historic Places in Sebastian County, Arkansas
Mining in Arkansas
1888 establishments in Arkansas